Ligne Aérienne Seychelles (LAS) was a charter airline based on Mahé in Seychelles. The airline was formed in 1986 by Christopher Hurndall, in collaboration with Paul Lewis, and began operating charter flights in December 1986 with a leased Boeing 707 (S7-LAS). The airline's destinations included Gaborone, Botswana; Lilongwe, Malawi; Perth, Australia and Singapore.

References

Defunct airlines of Seychelles
Airlines established in 1986
Airlines disestablished in 1987
1986 establishments in Seychelles